Medical Arts Building is an American historic medical office building located at Newport News, Virginia. It was designed by architect Charles M. Robinson and built in 1928. It was listed on the National Register of Historic Places in 2002.

Description 
It is a four-story, nine bay by ten bay, rectangular brick building with Greek Revival style decorative elements. It has a heavy galvanized metal, denticulated cornice with a denticulated pediment over the projecting center section. The flat roof is fronted by a tall, brick, parapet wall topped by cast concrete.  The front entrance is flanked by pilasters that support the entablature with the incised name Medical Arts Building. Above this is a shallow denticulated cornice that crowns the entire composition and carries a cast iron balustrade or false balcony.

History 
The building was historically been used as a commercial building and featured several doctors and dentists offices as early as 1931. Several of the original doctors offices had segregated waiting rooms for nonwhite patients, this was one of the few locations in the area nonwhites could go for medical care.  By 1971 at least two of the original doctors offices still remained. In later years tenants would include the Seaman's union, several attorneys, and an insurance agency. The historic building has since been converted into senior living apartments.

References

Commercial buildings on the National Register of Historic Places in Virginia
Greek Revival architecture in Virginia
Commercial buildings completed in 1928
Buildings and structures in Newport News, Virginia
National Register of Historic Places in Newport News, Virginia
1928 establishments in Virginia